Güicán is a town and municipality in the Colombian Department of Boyacá. It is close to the national natural park El Cocuy National Park.

References 

Municipalities of Boyacá Department